Ernst Larsson (1897–1963) was a Swedish chess master.

Career
He won in the Swedish Chess Championship at Borås 1936. He also won against José Raúl Capablanca in a simultaneous game at Stockholm 1928, tied for 3rd-4th at Falun 1934, took 2nd, behind Gösta Danielsson, at Göteborg 1935 (Quadrangular), took 3rd at Härnösand 1935, tied for 3rd-4th at Kalmar 1938 (Erik Lundin won), and tied for 8-9th at Örebro 1938 (Gideon Ståhlberg won). In September 1935, he played in a match Sweden vs Germany (Scheveningen system) in Zoppot (Sopot), and took 5-6th individual result (3.5/8). In June 1938, playing in a match Germany vs. Scandinavia in Bremen, he lost to Carl Ahues (0.5–1.5).

Olympics
He represented Sweden in the 6th Chess Olympiad at Warsaw 1935 (the reserve board), and in 3rd unofficial Chess Olympiad at Munich 1936 (the seventh board).

References

1897 births
1963 deaths
Swedish chess players
20th-century chess players